Christina Marie Birch (born November 17, 1986) is an American professional racing cyclist and NASA astronaut candidate.

Early life and career

Birch grew up in Gilbert, Arizona, and graduated from the University of Arizona with a bachelor's degree in mathematics and a bachelor's degree in biochemistry and molecular biophysics. Birch began cycling with the MIT cycling team while working on her PhD. While at MIT she won the 2014 USA Cycling collegiate cyclocross division two national championship. Birch also represented the JAM Fund cyclocross team from 2011-2015.

After earning a doctorate in biological engineering from MIT in 2015, Birch moved to Southern California to pursue track cycling full time. She taught bioengineering at the University of California, Riverside, and scientific writing and communication at the California Institute of Technology. On the track, Birch has represented the US at multiple Pan American Championships, World Cups, and World Championships. She competed at the 2018 UCI Track Cycling World Championships and the 2019 UCI Track Cycling World Championships.

Birch was named to the US track cycling 2020 Olympics long team for the USA in June 2020.

Astronaut candidacy
On December 6, 2021, Birch was formally announced as a NASA astronaut candidate with NASA Astronaut Group 23.

Major results

2014
National Cyclocross Championships
1st  Collegiate Division Two
2015
National Track Championships
2nd  Madison
2016
 National Track Championships
1st  Individual pursuit
2nd  Madison
2nd  Points race
2017
 National Track Championships
1st  Individual pursuit
1st  Team pursuit
2nd  Madison
2nd  Points race
2018
 Pan American Track Championships
1st  Team pursuit
2nd  Madison
 National Track Championships
1st  Team pursuit
1st   Madison
2nd  Points race
3rd  Omnium
2019
 Pan American Track Championships
2nd  Team pursuit
 National Track Championships
2nd  Madison
3rd  Points race
2nd  Omnium

Personal life 
She is a partner of a racing cyclist Ashton Lambie.

References

1986 births
University of Arizona alumni
Living people
American female cyclists
Astronaut candidates
American track cyclists